The Arunachal Pradesh Legislative Assembly is the unicameral legislature of the Indian state of Arunachal Pradesh.

The seat of the Legislative Assembly is at Itanagar, the capital of the state. The term of the Legislative Assembly is five years, unless dissolved earlier. Presently, it comprises 60 members who are directly elected from single-seat constituencies.

History of the Assembly constituencies
At the time of inception on 15 August 1975, the number of constituencies of the Arunachal Pradesh Legislative Assembly was 30. Since the attainment of the statehood on 20 February 1987, the number has been enhanced to 60 out of which 59 constituencies are reserved for the candidates belonging to the Scheduled tribes.

List of constituencies
Following is the list of the constituencies of the Arunachal Pradesh Legislative Assembly since 1987:

List of constituencies from 1975-1987
Following are list of the constituencies of the Arunachal Pradesh Legislative Assembly from 1975-1987:

References

Arunachal Pradesh
Constituencies of Arunachal Pradesh Legislative Assembly